The 1991–92 season was the 68th season in the existence of AEK Athens F.C. and the 33rd consecutive season in the top flight of Greek football. They competed in the Alpha Ethniki, the Greek Cup and the UEFA Cup. The season began on 18 August 1991 and finished on 7 June 1992.

Overview

A great season for AEK Athens, which were proclaimed champion of Greece. In the summer of 1991, Andreas Zafiropoulos was still the major shareholder of the club, but Kostas Generakis had taken over as president of the team. The new management of the team put the clubs finances of in order and at the same time proceeded with three successful transfers that would play a decisive role both in the specific year and in the future of the team. Specifically, the last season's European champion with Red Star Belgrade, Refik Šabanadžović, the international striker of Aris, Vasilis Dimitriadis and the top scorer of last season's second division and promising young striker from Veria, Alexis Alexandris arrived at the club. At the same time, the full support for Dušan Bajević was continued by the new administration.

The coach of AEK created a very good team and AEK stared at the league almost from the beginning. In the end, the team presented a solid substance in their game, while from time to time they offered a great spectacle and won the title, admittedly, with a difference of 3 points from the second Olympiacos. The decisive role for the conquest of the trophy was played by the 10 consecutive wins until the penultimate matchday, when the conquest for the title was already judged. It was remarkable that in the celebrations of the title in Toumba Stadium during the last matchday, about 6,000 fans of AEK were present and watched the match and the awarding of the championship trophy to the team. The most emphatic victories of the season were in the 6–0 against Panionios and 5–1 against Panachaiki at home and the 1–5 over Doxa Drama away from home, while the yellow-blacks won the title without winning any derby against Panathinaikos and Olympiacos.

In the UEFA Cup, luck smiled at AEK as they were drawn for the first round with the Albanian Vllaznia Shkodër. Thus, in September they travel to Shkodër, where they faced bigger problems than the local team, contrary to the predictions of a very comfortable victory. Vllaznia surprised AEK and in the first twenty minutes, they put a lot of pressure on them. However, as the minutes went on and after the initial excitement of the Albanians, AEK leveled the game and took the away victory with a beautiful goal by Dimitriadis. The rematch in Nikos Goumas Stadium had already acquired a procedural character and the formality of the case ended very quickly, since only at the 8th minute Papaioannou eliminated any possibility of the Albanians taking a positive result. AEK cleared the obligation with a second goal and just waited for the draw for the second round of the competition. This time, the draw was tough against Aleksandr Mostovoi's and Valery Karpin's Spartak Moscow. In the vast and cold Luzhniki Stadium they managed to achieve a difficult goalless draw against Oleg Romanchev's squad. In Athens, the Russians took the lead in the 15th minute with a penalty by Mostovoi and everything seemed to be over. However, with a rare display of soul and crowd that overwhelmed the stadium, AEK managed to turn the game around in the last half hour of the match. The whole crowd believed it and transmitted their energy to the team and in the 64th minute the in-form Batista leveled the game and in an amazing atmosphere 11 minutes later, Dimitriadis gave AEK a qualifying score. In the minutes that followed, the Russians put an incredible amount of pressure on the goalposts of the Minou and missed many chances to turn the tables on their side, but AEK endured and eventually celebrated a huge qualification. For the next round, AEK were drawn against the historic Torino. In the first match at home the stadium was buzzing, AEK was carried away by the excitement and closed Toro in their frames. Finally, the goal would come after a powershot from Batista with the completion of the 22nd minute. AEK continued attacking at the same pace and which payed by the Italians' first counter attack. The shock was huge and before the team realized it, Torino completed the comeback. What followed was an attacking monologue by AEK, but the counter-type Italians managed to save their backs and just accept the equalizer from Šabanadžović. AEK arrived in Turin for the rematch knowing that their task was by definition difficult. They pressed on and worried Emiliano Mondonico's team, but early in the second half, Toro with an impressive header by Casagrande, ended the qualification case. Several years later and due to the preliminary investigation into the "Calciopolis" scandal, the then general manager of Torino, Luciano Mozzi, was accused of having also influenced the referees in Toro's European matches that season, securing favor for the Piedmontese club and in the games against AEK.

In the institution of the cup, AEK having easily passed the first round in a group with Doxa Vyronas, EAR, Panachaiki and Aris Nikaias and having then also easily eliminated Ionikos and Iraklis, faced OFI in the quarter-finals. After a "white" draw in the first match, AEK won in Crete and qot the qualification. In the semi-finals, AEK was met PAOK and although in the first leg they theoretically got a "qualification-score" at Nea Filadelfeia with 2–0 they were eliminated at extra time with a 3–0 loss at Thessaloniki.

Leaders of this team were Manolas in defense, Savevski with Šabanadžović in midfield and the quartet of Dimitriadis-Batista-Savvidis-Alexandris on the front that "spat fire". However, the rest of the "starters" also had a great performance. The top scorer of the team and of the league was Dimitriadis with 28 goals.

On 27 May 1992, Kostas Generakis resigned from the Presidency of AEK. Immediately after, the duo Melissanidis-Karras expressed interest in the purchase of the shares of Zafiropoulos and the way was opened for them to get to work with the management of the club.

Players

Squad information

NOTE: The players are the ones that have been announced by the AEK Athens' press release. No edits should be made unless a player arrival or exit is announced. Updated 30 June 1992, 23:59 UTC+3.

Transfers

In

Summer

Notes

 a.  the last installment of the transfer fee.
 b.  plus the incomes from their two scheduled friendly games.

Out

Summer

Winter

Overall transfer activity

Expenditure
Summer:  ₯125,000,000

Winter:  ₯0

Total:  ₯125,000,000

Income
Summer:  ₯32,000,000

Winter:  ₯0

Total:  ₯32,000,000

Net Totals
Summer:  ₯93,000,000

Winter:  ₯0

Total:  ₯93,000,000

Pre-season and friendlies

Alpha Ethniki

League table

Results summary

Results by Matchday

Fixtures

Greek Cup

Group 6
<onlyinclude>

Matches

Round of 32

Round of 16

Quarter-finals

Semi-finals

UEFA Cup

First round

Second round

Third round

Statistics

Squad statistics

! colspan="11" style="background:#FFDE00; text-align:center" | Goalkeepers
|-

! colspan="11" style="background:#FFDE00; color:black; text-align:center;"| Defenders
|-

! colspan="11" style="background:#FFDE00; color:black; text-align:center;"| Midfielders
|-

! colspan="11" style="background:#FFDE00; color:black; text-align:center;"| Forwards
|-

! colspan="11" style="background:#FFDE00; color:black; text-align:center;"| Left during Winter Transfer Window
|-

|}

Disciplinary record

|-
! colspan="17" style="background:#FFDE00; text-align:center" | Goalkeepers

|-
! colspan="17" style="background:#FFDE00; color:black; text-align:center;"| Defenders

|-
! colspan="17" style="background:#FFDE00; color:black; text-align:center;"| Midfielders

|-
! colspan="17" style="background:#FFDE00; color:black; text-align:center;"| Forwards

|-
! colspan="17" style="background:#FFDE00; color:black; text-align:center;"| Left during Winter Transfer Window

|}

References

External links
AEK Athens F.C. Official Website

AEK Athens F.C. seasons
AEK Athens
Greek football championship-winning seasons